John Christian Jacobson (8 April 1795 – 24 November 1870) was a Moravian bishop in the United States.

Jacobson was born at the parish of Burkal in  Tønder, Denmark. His parents were both missionaries of the Moravian church in Denmark. He was educated at the Mission Institute in Niesky, the college and the theological seminary of the Moravian Church in Saxony.

In 1816, he came to the United States, and filled various offices in Nazareth, PA. Four years later he was made professor at the theological seminary in Bethlehem, Pennsylvania. In 1834, he was appointed principal of the female academy at Salem, North Carolina. He met with great success, building up that school until it became one of the best known and most prosperous girls' schools in the southern United States. Subsequently, he took charge of a boys' boarding school at Nazareth, Pennsylvania. On 20 September 1854, he was consecrated to the episcopacy, and stood at the head of the northern district of the church until 1867, when he retired. He died at age seventy-five in Bethlehem, PA.

Note

References

1795 births
1870 deaths
19th-century Moravian bishops
Danish emigrants to the United States
People from Aabenraa Municipality
People from Bethlehem, Pennsylvania
People from Salem, North Carolina
19th-century American clergy